Brandon Renee Whiting (born July 30, 1976 in Santa Rosa, California) is a former American football defensive end in the National Football League who played for the Philadelphia Eagles and San Francisco 49ers.

Early years
Whiting played high school football at Long Beach Polytechnic High School in Long Beach, California. The high school was later named the "Sports School of the Century" by Sports Illustrated in 2005. Whiting joins many other talented graduates. Long Beach Poly boasts having sent more players to the NFL than any other high school in the country.

College career
Whiting, a four-year starter on the defensive line for the CAL Golden Bears, earned second-team All-Pac-10 honors as a junior and senior, and honorable mention as a freshman. He wrapped up his stellar career with 24.5 sacks, which ranks as the third-best total in school history, and ranks sixth all-time with 35 tackles for loss. A two-time team captain, Whiting earned team awards as a senior for Most Valuable Defensive Lineman and the Joe Roth Award for courage, attitude, and sportsmanship. He was a three-time Pac-10 Conference All-Academic team member, carrying a 3.24 GPA in Developmental Studies at Cal.CAL Bears

Professional career

Philadelphia Eagles
Whiting was drafted by the Philadelphia Eagles in the fourth round of the 1998 NFL Draft. In 2004, he was traded to the San Francisco 49ers along with a 5th round draft pick for Wide Receiver Terrell Owens.

1976 births
Living people
Philadelphia Eagles players
California Golden Bears football players
San Francisco 49ers players